South Side Baptist School was a private K3-12th grade Christian school in Oak Lawn, Illinois with a Christian curriculum. South Side Baptist School was founded in 1975 as a ministry of South Side Baptist Church. The school was shut down in the summer of 2019.

References 

Baptist schools in the United States
Christian schools in Illinois
Educational institutions established in 1975
Private elementary schools in Cook County, Illinois
Private high schools in Cook County, Illinois
Private middle schools in Cook County, Illinois